Leslie Hill is a hill lying northward of Bowles Ridge and south of the Vidin Heights in the eastern part of Livingston Island in the South Shetland Islands, Antarctica.  Situated 5.33 km north of Mount Bowles, 1.43 km east-northeast of the summit of Gleaner Heights and 3.15 km south-southwest of Radnevo Peak.

The hill was named by the UK Antarctic Place-Names Committee in 1958 for David Leslie, Master of the American brig Gleaner, a whaler from New Bedford, Massachusetts, which was diverted to sealing in 1820–21 in the South Shetland Islands, following the discovery of this group.

See also
 Tangra 2004/05

Maps
 L.L. Ivanov et al. Antarctica: Livingston Island and Greenwich Island, South Shetland Islands. Scale 1:100000 topographic map. Sofia: Antarctic Place-names Commission of Bulgaria, 2005.
 L.L. Ivanov. Antarctica: Livingston Island and Greenwich, Robert, Snow and Smith Islands. Scale 1:120000 topographic map.  Troyan: Manfred Wörner Foundation, 2009.
 L.L. Ivanov. Antarctica: Livingston Island and Smith Island. Scale 1:100000 topographic map. Manfred Wörner Foundation, 2017.

References

Hills of Livingston Island